Blackpink in Your Area is the first Japanese compilation album, and first double album by South Korean girl group Blackpink. The album was released through YGEX on November 23, 2018, followed by physical release in Japan on December 5.

The album is a compilation of every song released by Blackpink at the time, including their eponymous Japanese EP and debut Korean extended play Square Up. Digital editions of the album include only the Japanese versions of the songs (with the last three tracks being made available in this language for the first time), while the physical release is a double album featuring the Japanese versions on disc one, and the Korean versions on disc two.

Background and release
On October 19, 2018, it was announced that the group would release their first Japanese compilation album. It was also revealed that the album would be released in 12 versions on December 5. On November 13, it was reported that the group had partnered with Shiseido for the release of their album. It was also revealed that the album will include the Japanese versions of "Forever Young", "Really", and "See U Later" previously released on the group's debut Korean extended play, Square Up (2018).

On November 22, it was revealed that the album would be released on digital stores on November 23, containing the nine Japanese versions from the group's singles.

The album was released digitally on November 23, 2018.

Commercial performance 
The album debuted at number 8 on the Oricon Albums Chart in its first day and peaked at number 7 in its second day. In its third day the album dropped to number 11 and to number 17 in its fourth day, and rose to number 10 in its fifth day, dropping to number 16 in its sixth day.

The album debuted at number 9 on the Oricon Albums Chart in its first week with 13,878 physical copies sold and dropped to number 30 in its second week with 3,044 additional copies sold. The album debuted at number 91 on Billboard Japan's Top Download Albums staying for two weeks, before peaking at number 77 in its third week. It also debuted at number 12 on Billboard Japan's Hot Albums, placing at number 9 on Top Albums Sales with 14,710 copies combined sold.

Track listing
Credits adapted from liner notes of Blackpink in Your Area. All songs are Japanese version unless specified.

Charts

Release history

References

2018 debut albums
Blackpink albums